San Marco, the Italian form of Saint Mark, is one of the six sestieri of Venice. It may also refer to:

Buildings and structures
Italy
 San Marco, Florence, a religious complex
 San Marco, Milan, or Church of St. Mark
 San Marco, Rome, a basilica
 Piazza San Marco, St. Mark's Square, in the San Marco district of Venice

Kenya
 San Marco platform, a launch platform of the Broglio Space Centre

United States
 San Marco (Spokane, Washington), a historic building listed on the U.S. National Register of Historic Places

Places
Italy
San Marco, is one of six districts (sestiere) of the city of Venice, Italy
San Marco (Castellabate), a village of Castellabate (SA), Campania
Albaredo per San Marco, a municipality in the Province of Sondrio, Lombardy
Caerano di San Marco, a municipality in the Province of Treviso, Veneto
Cellino San Marco, a municipality in the Province of Brindisi, Apulia
San Marco Argentano, a municipality in the Province of Cosenza, Calabria
San Marco d'Alunzio, a municipality in the Province of Messina, Sicily
San Marco dei Cavoti, a municipality in the Province of Benevento, Campania
San Marco Evangelista, a municipality in the Province of Caserta, Campania
San Marco in Lamis, a municipality in the Province of Foggia, Apulia
San Marco la Catola, a municipality in the Province of Foggia, Apulia
 San Marco Pass, a mountain pass in the Bergamo Alps
United States
 San Marco (Jacksonville), a neighborhood of Jacksonville, Florida
 San Marco station, a transit station in Jacksonville

Ships
 Italian cruiser San Marco, an Italian armoured cruiser built in 1908
 SS San Marco, a German freighter sunk in the Battle of the Duisburg Convoy during the Second World War
 San Marco, a San Giorgio-class amphibious transport dock in the Italian Navy

Other
 San Marco programme, an Italian-US satellite programme
 San Marco Regiment, the marines of the Italian Navy
 San Marco (board game), a board game by Alan R. Moon and Aaron Weissblum
 Jennifer San Marco (1961-2006), American spree killer and perpetrator of the Goleta postal facility shootings

See also
 Saint-Marc (disambiguation)
 Saint Mark (disambiguation)
 San Marcos (disambiguation)
 São Marcos